Syriatel is a mobile network provider in Syria. It is one of the only two providers in Syria, the other being MTN Syria. In 2022 the Syrian telecommunications authority awarded the third telecom license to Wafa Telecom. It offers  LTE with 150 Mb/s speeds, under the brand name Super Surf.

History 
Syriatel was founded in January 2000, with its headquarters in Damascus, Syria. The Government licenses two private companies to supply mobile phone services, Syriatel and "94".  Orascom provided the management. The license with the Government was a Build-own-transfer (BOT) contract for 15 years.  In 2017 Syriatel introduced 4G speeds offering 150 Mb/s speeds, branded Super Surf. On 5 June 2020, a Syrian court ordered Syriatel be placed under judicial custody.

Ownership 
When the company was founded in 2000, Syriatel was owned by the Egyptian telecommunications company Orascom (25%) and Rami Makhlouf (75%), cousin of Syrian president Bashar al-Assad. In 2003, Orascom sold its ownership in Syriatel.

Company 
The company is owned by Rami Makhlouf, cousin of Syrian president Bashar al-Assad. The company had approximately 3,500 employees and 8 million customers as of 2016. It is headquartered on Sehnaya Road in Damascus.

Technologies 
Syriatel operate a network of GSM 900 / 1800 & 3G 2100 & 4G 1800 cellular networks.

Sanctions 
In 2011 the European Union imposed sanctions on Syriatel in order to intensify pressure on Syrian President Bashar al-Assad.

References

Telecommunications companies of Syria
Internet service providers of Syria
Companies established in 2000
2000 establishments in Syria
Companies based in Damascus
Syrian brands
Companies of Syria